Dnevnik is a regional daily newspaper, published in Novi Sad, Serbia.

The newspaper was founded during Axis occupation in 1942, and its original name was Slobodna Vojvodina. The first issue was published on November 15, 1942 as an organ of the provincial people's liberation board for Vojvodina in an underground printing house in Novi Sad. Its first editor was Svetozar Marković Toza who was later executed by the Axis occupation authorities on February 9, 1943 and subsequently proclaimed a people's hero by the Yugoslav post-World War II communist authorities.

On January 1, 1953, the newspaper's name was officially changed to Dnevnik.

See also 
 List of newspapers in Serbia

External links
Official website

Newspapers published in Serbia
Newspapers published in Yugoslavia
Culture of Vojvodina
Mass media in Novi Sad